Plotlands was a British period drama series was written and created by Jeremy Brock and that aired on BBC1 from 18 May to 22 June 1997. Produced by Wall to Wall for the BBC, it tells the story of several families who live in the fictional town of Plotlands. The series was filmed on location in and around Ashridge.

Cast
David Ryall as Harry Crowley
Philip Whitchurch as Billy Reed
Richard Lintern as Tom Marsh
Rebecca Callard as Harriet Marsh
Amanda Abbington as Maude
Jade Williams as Joan Marsh
Saskia Reeves as Chloe Marsh
Richard Cordery as Charles Foster
Jamie Glover as Ralph Samson
Petra Markham as Grace Foster
Eve Schickle as Beattie Crowley
Terence Beesley as Jon Marsh
Richard Amery as Charlie

Awards
Les Lansdown won the Royal Television Society Craft & Design Award for Best Costume Design Drama.

References

External links

1997 British television series debuts
1997 British television series endings
1990s British drama television series
Period television series
BBC television dramas
1990s British television miniseries
Television series by Warner Bros. Television Studios
Television series set in the 1920s
English-language television shows
Television shows set in Hertfordshire